Missulena occatoria, known as the red-headed mouse spider, is a species of spider found in Southern Australia, from open forest to desert shrubland. It is the largest (females up to 24 mm, males up to 12 mm) and most widely distributed Missulena species, because the spiderlings are wind-dispersed (ballooning). Normally this only occurs with araneomorph spiders, mygalomorph spiders normally disperse by walking. Missulena venom may be very toxic, but few cases of serious envenomation have been recorded. Most recorded bites only caused minor effects, with Australian funnel-web spider antivenom having proved effective as a treatment.

The spiders dig a burrow up to 55 cm deep, with two trapdoors.

While the females are black with a red tinge, the males have a bright red head and jaws, and a gunmetal blue-black abdomen.

Taxonomy
M. occatoria was first described by Charles Athanase Walckenaer in 1805. Some confusion exists between this species and M. insignis. For example, H. Womersley in 1943 regarded Actinopus formosus as a synonym of M. occatoria, whereas Barbara York Main in 1985 treated it as a synonym of M. insignis, the position adopted by the World Spider Catalog. She considered that Womersley had partly confused M. occatoria and M. insignis, with M. occatoria only occurring in eastern Australia. According to Framenau et al., the two cannot be differentiated based on the original description.

References

External links

 Information and pictures of M. occatoria

occatoria
Spiders of Australia
Spiders described in 1805
Taxa named by Charles Athanase Walckenaer